S. G. Thakur Singh (1899–1976) was an Indian artist who painted in oils, pastels and water colour

Childhood
He was born in the tiny farm village of Verka, four miles Northeast of Amritsar, Punjab, India. He received some art training from Mohammed Alam, the Muslim school teacher in the village.

Interviewed at the age of 74, Singh said that when he was seventeen, "I was forced by my guardians to join the Victoria Diamond Hindu Technical Institute, Lahore, to take up an engineering course. I wasted there two years and left it in disgust."When he returned to his village his former teacher, Mohammed Alam, persuaded him to come to Mumbai, where Alam had secured a job as a scene-painter in a Mumbai theatre. While in Mumbai, Singh worked both at odd jobs in the studio and on his own, with Alam guiding him.

"One fine morning" Singh recalls, "I was busy painting a landscape at Chowpati Beach, Mumbai, when a couple suddenly stopped beside me and began admiring my painting which was, by that time, almost complete. The gentlemen, an influential Parsi editor of a Bombay Magazine, goaded me into sending the painting to an exhibition of the Simla Fine Arts Society." There his painting won the first prize of Rs. 500, among the landscapes. I was then only eighteen, and you can well imagine my joy and pride at getting the prize.

Just as that chance encounter on Chowpati Beach led to his first prize in the painting, throughout his life he had many worthy patrons. Rabindra Nath Tagore, Dr. Rajendra Prasad and artists and critics have paid tribute to his work.

Later career

From Mumbai he moved to Kolkata where he lived and worked for several theatrical companies, working initially at Madan Theatre as a scene painter. The Tagores became his patrons, and the public too got to appreciate his work through reproductions in Bengali journals. His seductive paintings of women, such as After the Bath were especially popular. According to Partha Mitter, author of The triumph of modernism: India's artists and the avant-garde, 1922–1947 and the art critic Krishna Chaitanya, Thakur Singh followed the style of the Bengali artist Hemendranath Mazumdar in painting such themes.

With friends, Thakur Singh organised the Punjab Fine Art Society in Kolkata, and the Society's first Exhibition was held in 1926. The Society promoted Thakur Singh's own works, publishing his paintings in The Art of S. G. Thakur Singh and Glimpses of India, the latter book had introductions by Rabindranath and Abanindranath Tagore. Thakur Singh worked specially for the rulers of Indian princely states on commissions, the rulers of Kotah, Udaipur, Bhopal, Kashmir and others being his patrons.

Thakur Singh moved back to Amritsar in 1931, where he founded the Thakur Singh School of Art. Several of its past students are now achieving recognition as artists or as art-teachers and it has been lately recognised by the Industrial Training Department of the Punjab Government to award a diploma of Art & Craft, teacher's course.

He painted in oils, pastels and water colour. He painted nearly ten thousand paintings, and has won many awards. His paintings hang in museums, public buildings and in private collections around the world.

India honoured him in other ways too. He was nominated to the First Punjab Legislative Council in 1952. He was on the Executive Board of the National Academy of Art (Lalit Kala Akademy) and was Chairman of the Decoration Sub Committee at the 61st Session of the Indian National Congress held at Amritsar in 1956. He was invited to the former USSR and Hungary for solo shows in Moscow, Leningrad and Budapest.

He was commissioned to do many portraits, but it is his landscapes which have won for him popular acclaim.

He received award of Padma Shri in 1973.

Auction Results

References

External links
 S G Thakur Singh website
 S.G.Thakur Singh's books at WorldCat
 S.G.Thakur Singh
 S G Thakur Singh at Government Museum, Chandigarh

Indian male painters
Recipients of the Padma Shri in arts
People from Amritsar district
1976 deaths
1899 births
20th-century Indian painters
Indian watercolourists
Painters from Punjab, India
20th-century Indian male artists